The 2019–20 All-Ireland Junior Club Football Championship was the 19th staging of the All-Ireland Junior Club Football Championship since its establishment by the Gaelic Athletic Association.

The All-Ireland final was played on 25 January 2020 at Croke Park in Dublin, between Na Gaeil and Rathgarogue-Cushinstown. Na Gaeil won the match by 3-20 to 1-05 to claim their first ever championship title.

All-Ireland Junior Club Football Championship

All-Ireland quarter-final

All-Ireland semi-finals

All-Ireland final

References

2019 in Irish sport
2020 in Irish sport
All-Ireland Junior Club Football Championship
All-Ireland Junior Club Football Championship